"Trip" is a song by English singer Ella Mai from her eponymous debut studio album. The song peaked at number 47 in the UK and number 11 on the Billboard Hot 100 in the United States. The song was written by Mai, Varren Wade, Quinton, and Dijon MacFarlane. The single became her first number one on Billboards Rhythmic chart in its 22 December 2018 issue.

Music video

An accompanying music video for the song premiered via Mai's Vevo channel on 18 September 2018.

Jacquees remix
Cash Money R&B singer Jacquees' "Quemix" of the track gained huge popularity, receiving millions of streams on YouTube and SoundCloud. However, Jacquees' version was removed from both platforms on September 5. Ella Mai's label boss DJ Mustard later said that his label 10 Summers sent a cease and desist, claiming Jacquees had attempted to monetize the remix and accused him of "stealing" from 10 Summers. Jacquees disputed these claims.

Charts

Weekly charts

Year-end charts

Certifications

Release history

References

2018 songs
2018 singles
Ella Mai songs
Songs written by Mustard (record producer)
Song recordings produced by Mustard (record producer)
Songs written by Ella Mai